Meg Ryan is an American actress and producer. Ryan began her acting career in 1981 in minor roles before joining the cast of the CBS soap opera As the World Turns in 1982. Subsequently, she began to appear in supporting roles in films during the mid 1980s like box office hit Top Gun, achieving recognition in independent films such as Promised Land (1987) before her performance in the Rob Reiner-directed romantic comedy When Harry Met Sally... (1989) brought her widespread attention and her first Golden Globe nomination.

Ryan subsequently established herself, both nationally and internationally, as one of the most successful actresses in the 1990s and early 2000s, particularly in romantic comedy films such as Sleepless in Seattle (1993), French Kiss (1995), You've Got Mail (1998), Hanging Up (2000) and Kate & Leopold (2001). Her other films include The Doors (1991), When a Man Loves a Woman (1994), Courage Under Fire (1996), Addicted to Love (1997), City of Angels (1998), Proof of Life (2000), and The Women (2008). In 2015, she made her directorial debut with Ithaca, a film in which she also acted.

Filmography

Film

Television

Documentaries

References

Actress filmographies
American filmographies